Erysiphales are an order of ascomycete fungi. The order contains one family, Erysiphaceae. Many of them cause plant diseases called powdery mildew.

Systematics 
The order contains one family (Erysiphaceae), 28 genera and approximately 100 species. Many imperfect fungi (fungi whose sexual reproduction is unknown) belong here, especially the genus Oidium.
Recent molecular data have revealed the existence of six main evolutionary lineages. Clade 1 consists of Erysiphe, Microsphaera, and Uncinula, all of which have an Oidium subgenus Pseudoidium mitosporic state. Clade 2 consists of Erysiphe galeopsidis and Erysiphe cumminsiana (anamorphs in Oidium subgenus Striatoidium). Clade 3 consists of Erysiphe species with anamorphs in Oidium subgenus Reticuloidium. Clade 4 consists of Leveillula and Phyllactinia, which have Oidiopsis and Ovulariopsis mitosporic states, respectively. Clade 5 consists of Sphaerotheca, Podosphaera, and Cystotheca, which have Oidium subgenera Fibroidium and Setoidium mitosporic states. Clade 6 consists of Blumeria graminis, which has an Oidium subgenus Oidium mitosporic state. Several morphological characters have been analysed and found not to conflict with the molecular data.

Characteristics 
 Erysiphales have a superficial mycelium which extracts nourishment from the host plant through specialized hyphae that penetrate the epidermal cells of the host by means of absorbing organs called haustoria.
 The teleomorphs are usually more distinctive and diverse than the anamorphs. Whether the asci are bitunicate or unitunicate (i.e. consisting of one or two layers), is as yet a matter of discussion.
 The cleistothecia (or chasmothecia) have the asci arranged in a hymenial layer, resembling perithecia.
From the outer wall of the cleistothecium specialised hyphae (appendages) grow out. The number of asci per ascoma varies, and is important in discriminating between genera.

Life cycle
The infection of the host plant begins with the sexual ascospores, or the asexual conidia germinating on the surface of the plants leaf or stem, resulting in septate mycelium of uninucleate cells. In most powdery mildews only the epidermal cells are attacked. The external mycelium gives rise to short, erect conidiophores, each of which bear a single row of barrel-shaped spores, the youngest being at the base (the affected parts become thus covered with a forest of conidiophores assuming a white powdery appearance). The ripe spores become detached and are readily dispersed by the wind, causing fresh infection. In autumn the sexual cleistothecia are produced. The cleistothecia represent the resting (hibernating) stage of the pathogen. The ascospores remain dormant all winter to germinate in spring. When the asci expand they rupture the cleistothecia wall, throwing the ascospores into the air.

Ecology
Erysiphales are obligate parasites on leaves and fruits of higher plants, causing diseases called powdery mildews. Most attempts to grow them in culture have failed.

Erysiphales have a nearly cosmopolitan distribution, except Australia, and have developed fungicide resistance just as widely. Total loss of function has resulted in some cases. Resistance management planning, use of multi-mode of action fungicides, and altered frequency and quantity of application are needed to slow the progress of resistance.

Genera
 Arthrocladiella
 Blumeria
 Brasiliomyces
 Bulbomicrosphaera
 Bulbouncinula
 Caespitotheca
 Cystotheca
 Erysiphe (Oidium)
 Golovinomyces
 Leveillula (Oidiopsis)
 Medusosphaera
 Microsphaera
 Neoerysiphe
 Oidium
 Phyllactinia (Ovulariopsis)
 Pleochaeta
 Podosphaera
 Sawadaea
 Setoerysiphe
 Sphaerotheca
 Typhulochaeta
 Uncinula
 Uncinuliella

References 

 
 
 A University of Winnipeg page on Erysiphales 
 Key to common genera (4 megabyte file) 
 

 
Fungal plant pathogens and diseases
Ascomycota orders
Monotypic fungus taxa
Taxa named by Edmond Tulasne